The Serrano Bulldog is a Brazilian dog breed recognized by the Brazilian Confederation of Cynophilia (CBKC).

Name 
Serrano is a Portuguese word widely used in Brazil as a term for those who are from regions with hills; it is a synonym of hillside or mountain used as substantive adjectives.

Temperament 
A guardian of balanced temperament; does not show gratuitous aggression to people or other dogs, but does not hesitate in attacking under command or when provoked; has extreme submission to its owner.

See also
 Dogs portal
 List of dog breeds
 Campeiro Bulldog
 Pampas Deerhound

References

External links 

Dog breeds originating in Brazil
Bulldog breeds
Rare dog breeds